Mamadou Diop (9 May 1936 – 26 March 2018) was a Senegalese politician, and a member of the central committee of the Socialist Party of Senegal. Diop was the mayor of the capital city of Dakar for 18 years between 1984 and 2002.

He was a member of the Lebou ethnic group.

See also
 List of mayors of Dakar
 Timeline of Dakar

References

Further reading 
 African Words, African Voices: Critical Practices in Oral History. Luise White, Stephan Miescher, David William Cohen.  Indiana University Press, 2001.  
 Parti Socialiste - Senegal, "Comité central", retrieved 27 September 2008.

1936 births
2018 deaths
Senegalese Muslims
Mayors of Dakar
People from Dakar
Lebou people
Mayors of places in Senegal
Socialist Party of Senegal politicians
Health ministers of Senegal